Andrey Shtygel (born 22 June 1994) is a Belarusian professional football player.

Match-fixing incidents
On 16 January 2020, the BFF banned Shtygel for 12 months for his involvement in the match fixing. On 2 December 2021 Shtygel was banned from Belarusian football for life for another attempt to fix a game.

References

External links
 
 

1994 births
Living people
Belarusian footballers
Association football midfielders
FC Dinamo Minsk players
FC Neman Grodno players
FC Lida players
FC Naftan Novopolotsk players
FC Gomel players
FC Smorgon players
Sportspeople involved in betting scandals
Match fixers
Sportspeople banned for life